Haroon Ismail (born February 27, 1955) is a former tennis professional from Rhodesia and Zimbabwe.

Ismail reached his highest ATP singles ranking on February 22, 1982, when he became world Number 95. He became runner-up in the 1980 Dutch Open tennis tournament.
In 1981, Ismail won two rounds at the French Open, beating Francisco Gonzalez and Eric Deblicker, before losing to 14th-seed Wojtek Fibak.

Ismail played college tennis at Southern Methodist University.

References

External links
 
 
 

1955 births
Living people
People from Chattanooga, Tennessee
Sportspeople from Harare
Rhodesian male tennis players
SMU Mustangs men's tennis players
Zimbabwean expatriates in the United States
Zimbabwean male tennis players